This is a list of past and present army units whose names include the word guard. Border guards, Coast guards, Civil guards, Factory guards, Home guards, National guards, Honour guards, Republican guards, and Royal guards are listed under their own articles.  See also Presidential Guard and Red Guards (disambiguation).

Active

Australia 
 Federation Guard

Austria 
 Gardebataillon

Bahrain 
 Royal Guard

Belarus 
38th Guards Air Assault Brigade
51st Guards Artillery Brigade
72nd Guards Joint Training Centre
120th Guards Mechanised Brigade
11th Guards Berlin-Carpathian Mechanized Brigade
19th Guards Mechanized Brigade

Bhutan 
 Royal Bodyguard of Bhutan

Bulgaria 
 National Guards Unit of Bulgaria, elite military unit of the Bulgarian Land Forces used for ceremonial and special duties.

Canada 
 Governor General's Foot Guards
 The Governor General's Horse Guards
 The Canadian Grenadier Guards

China (PRC)

1st Guard Division
Central Guard Corps 
Beijing Garrison Honor Guard Battalion 
3rd Guard Division
17th Guard Regiment

Denmark 
 Royal Life Guards 
 Guard Hussar Regiment Mounted Squadron

Estonia 
 Guard Battalion

Finland 
 Guard Jaeger Regiment

Germany 
 Wachbataillon

India 
 Brigade of the Guards

Israel 
 Knesset Guard (Hebrew: Mishmar HaKnesset) responsible for the security of the Knesset building and the protection of its members (MKs).

Jordan 
 Royal Guard Brigade

Kazakhstan 
35th Guards Air Assault Brigade
210th Guards Training Center
390th Guards Naval Infantry Brigade

Montenegro 
 Honour Guard Company

Morocco 
 Moroccan Royal Guard

Netherlands 
 Garderegiment Fuseliers Prinses Irene
 Grenadiers' and Rifles Guard Regiment

North Korea

Guard Units
 Guards Seoul Ryu Kyong Su 105th Tank Division
 Guards 1st Infantry Division
 Guards Kang Kon 2nd Infantry Division
 Guards Seoul 3rd Infantry Division
 Guards Seoul Kim Chaek 4th Infantry Division 
 Guards 6th Infantry Division
 Andong Choe Chun Guk 12th Infantry Division 
 Guards 10th Infantry Regiment
 Guards 14th Infantry Regiment
 Guards Ri Hun 18th Infantry Regiment
 Guards 86th Infantry Regiment
 Guards 19th Anti-Aircraft Artillery Regiment
 Guards 23rd Anti-Aircraft Artillery Regiment
 Guards 26th Anti-Aircraft Artillery Regiment
 Guards 2nd Torpedo Boat Fleet
 Guards 1st Air Division
 Guards Hero Kim Ji Sang 56th Fighter Regiment
 Guards 60th Fighter Regiment
 Guards 1st Construction Brigade

Units with the word guards
 Worker-Peasant Red Guards
 Youth Red Guards
 Supreme Guard Command - also known as KPA Unit 963

Norway 
 His Majesty The King's Guard

Oman 
 Royal Guard of Oman

Romania 
 30th Honor Guard Brigade "Mihai Viteazul"

Russia

Saudi Arabia 
 Saudi Royal Guard Regiment

Serbia 
 Guard, unit of the Serbian Armed Forces used for ceremonial duties.

Singapore 
 Guards, elite infantry unit of the Singapore Army used for special operations.

Slovenia 
 Slovenian Guards Unit

Spain 
 Guardia Real
 Guardia Mora
 "Old Guard of Castille" Honor Guard Battalion and Regimental Band, Infantry Regiment "Inmemorial del Rey" No. 1

Sweden 
 Life Guards

Switzerland 
 Swiss Guard, Swiss mercenary soldiers who served as guards at foreign European courts.

Thailand 
 King's Guard (ceremonial designation given to units from the three branches of service)

Ukraine

United Kingdom 
 Household Division
 Foot Guards
 Grenadier Guards
 Coldstream Guards
 Scots Guards
 Irish Guards
 Welsh Guards
 Household Cavalry
 Life Guards
 Blues and Royals (Royal Horse Guards and 1st Dragoons) .
 Royal Armoured Corps
 1st The Queen's Dragoon Guards
 Royal Dragoon Guards
 Royal Scots Dragoon Guards

Vietnam 

 Vietnam People's Army:  
 Vietnam Border Guard: border protection
 Vietnam Coast Guard: coast protection
 General Staff of the Vietnam People's Army:
 144th Guarding Brigade: protective guards of Ministry of Defense headquarter, General Staff headquarter as well as national and international conferences 
 Military Honor Guard Unit: honor guard during visits of foreign leaders, National Day parade, Military Memory days...
 Ministry of Defense:
 Command of Ho Chi Minh Mausoleum Guard: protection of Ho Chi Minh Mausoleum

Historical

Bavaria
 Royal Bavarian Infantry Lifeguards Regiment

Byzantine 
 Varangian Guard, a unit of the Byzantine emperor chiefly made up of troops of Scandinavian and North West European origin.

China
 Imperial Guards (Qing dynasty)
 Imperial Guards (Tang dynasty)
 Manchukuo Imperial Guards
3rd Interior Guard Division 
4th Guard Division

East Germany
 Felix Dzerzhinsky Guards Regiment
 Friedrich Engels Guard Regiment
 Guard Regiment Hugo Eberlein

Ethiopia
 Mehal Sefari ("Center Campers")
 Kebur Zabagna ("Honorable Guard")

Finland
For Guards units before 1918, see Russian Empire.

France
Maison militaire du roi de France
 Garde du Corps
 Garde Écossaise
Mousquetaires de la Garde
 Imperial Guard (Napoleon I)
 1st Polish Light Cavalry Regiment of the Imperial Guard
 2e régiment de chevau-légers lanciers de la Garde Impériale
 Chasseurs à Cheval de la Garde Impériale
 Dragons de la Garde Impériale
 Éclaireurs of the Guard
 Gendarmes d'élite de la Garde Impériale
 Grenadiers à Cheval de la Garde Impériale
 Lithuanian Tartars of the Imperial Guard
 Mamelukes of the Imperial Guard
 Imperial Guard (Napoleon III)
 Cent-gardes Squadron

German Empire
 Guards Corps
 Guards Cavalry Division
 1st Guards Infantry Division
 2nd Guards Infantry Division
 Guards Reserve Corps
 3rd Guards Infantry Division
 1st Guards Reserve Division
 4th Guards Infantry Division
 5th Guards Infantry Brigade
 Guards Reserve Uhlans
 2nd Guards Field Artillery
 5th Guards Infantry Division
 2nd Guards Reserve Division
 Guard Ersatz Division

Iran
 Imperial Guard

Japan
 Imperial Guard (Imperial Japanese Army, 1867–1945)

Morocco
 Black Guard

Prussia 
 Guards Corps

Cavalry
 Gardes du Corps, also known as the "Prussian Guard" a Prussian formation until 1918
 Guards Cuirassier Regiment
 1st (Queen Victoria of Great Britain and Ireland) Guards Dragoons
 2nd (Empress Alexandra of Russia) Guards Dragoons
 1st Guards Uhlans
 2nd Guards Uhlans
 3rd Guards Uhlans
 Life Guards Hussars

Infantry(each of the Foot Guards and four of the Guards Grenadiers would form reserve (Landwehr) units upon mobilization in August 1914)

 1st Foot Guards
 2nd Foot Guards
 3rd Foot Guards
 4th Foot Guards
 5th Foot Guards
 1st (Emperor Alexander) Guards Grenadiers
 2nd (Emperor Francis) Guards Grenadiers
 3rd (Queen Elizabeth) Guards Grenadiers
 4th (Queen Augusta) Guards Grenadiers
 5th Guards Grenadiers
 Guards Fusiliers
 Guards Jäger Battalion
 Palace Guards Company
 1st Guards Machine Gun Detachment
 2nd Guards Machine Gun Detachment

Artillery

 1st Guards Field Artillery
 2nd Guards Field Artillery
 3rd Guards Field Artillery
 4th Guards Field Artillery
 Guards Foot Artillery

Support units
 Guards Engineers
 Guards Trains

Papal States
 Corsican Guard
 Noble Guard
 Palatine Guard

Poland
 Royal Guards

Portugal 
 Royal Guard of the Archers

Roman Empire 
 Praetorian Guard

Russian Empire 
 Imperial Guard
 1st Guard Cavalry Division
 1st Guards Infantry Division
 2nd Guard Cavalry division
 3rd Guard Infantry Division
 Chevalier Guard Regiment
 Egersky Guards Regiment
 Finland Guard Regiment
 Finnish Guards' Rifle Battalion
 Moscow Guard Regiment

Saxony 
 1st Royal Saxon Guards Heavy Cavalry

Soviet Union 
 Guards unit, a type of military unit of the former Soviet Union

Spanish Netherlands 
 Walloon Guards

Sri Lanka 
Army
 President's Guard
Army reserve
 Sri Lanka National Guard

Sweden 
 Life Guards of Horse (K 1)
 Life Guards Squadron (K 1)
 Life Guard Dragoons (K 1)
 Svea Life Guards (I 1)
  (I 2), an infantry regiment 1742–1939
 Göta Life Guards (P 1), an armoured regiment 1943–1980
 Finnish Guards

United Kingdom 
 1st Regiment of Life Guards
 2nd Regiment of Life Guards
 Royal Horse Guards - predecessor unit to the Blues and Royals
 1st King's Dragoon Guards -1959
 2nd Dragoon Guards (Queen's Bays) -1922
 3rd Dragoon Guards (Prince of Wales's) 1746-1922
 4th Royal Irish Dragoon Guards -1922
 5th (Princess Charlotte of Wales's) Dragoon Guards 1788-1922
 Carabiniers (6th Dragoon Guards) 1788-1922
 7th (The Princess Royal's) Dragoon Guards  -1922
 1st The Queen's Dragoon Guards 1959-
 3rd Carabiniers (Prince of Wales's Dragoon Guards) 1922-1971 (also known as "3rd/6th Dragoon Guards")
 4th/7th Royal Dragoon Guards 1922-1992
 5th Royal Inniskilling Dragoon Guards 192-
 Horse Grenadier Guards 1687 - 1788
 Horse Guards Regiment - a number of temporary regiments carried this name.
 1st Troop of Horse Guards
 Guards Machine Gun Regiment
 Royal Guards Reserve Regiment

Organizational units
 Brigade of Guards
 Guards Division
 Guards Armoured Division
 1st Guards Brigade
 2nd Guards Brigade
 3rd Guards Brigade
 4th Guards Brigade
 5th Guards Armoured Brigade 1941-1945 (later 5th Guards Brigade)
 6th Guards Tank Brigade (United Kingdom) 1941-1945 (later 6th Guards Brigade)
 20th Independent Infantry Brigade (Guards)
 22nd Guards Brigade
 32nd Guards Infantry Brigade 1941-1945

Vatican 
 Noble Guard

Vietnam 
 Red Guards (Tự vệ Đỏ) is the precursor force of Vietnam's today police. The Red Guards were formed by Indochinese Communist Party in 1930 - 1931, during Nghệ-Tĩnh uprising against French rule.

See also 
 List of Jäger units

Notes

References 
 Philip Mansel, Pillars of Monarchy: An Outline of the Political and Social History of Royal Guards 1400–1984, 

Guards, army units called